The discography of John Otway, an English singer-songwriter, consists of 13 albums, 30 singles and a number of compilation albums.

Albums

VHSs

Compilations

DVDs

Singles

CD Singles

Discographies of British artists